Clavatula delphinae is a species of sea snail, a marine gastropod mollusk in the family Clavatulidae.

Description
The size of an adult shell varies between 10 mm and 35 mm.

Distribution
This species occurs in the Atlantic Ocean between Ghana and Democratic Republic of the Congo.

References

 Nolf, F. (2008). Two new turrid species from West Africa: Clavatula delphinae and Clavatula pseudomystica (Mollusca: Gastropoda: Clavatulidae). Neptunea 7(2): 6-13

External links
 

delphinae
Gastropods described in 2008